Hermann Abbestée (29 July 1728 – 29 December 1794) was Danish governor of Tranquebar from 1762 to 1775 and the first royal governor of  Danish India from 1779 to 1788.  He served as one of the seven directors of the Danish Asiatic Company from 1775 to 1778 and was also active as a trader.

Early life and background
Abbestée was born on 29 July 1728 in Copenhagen, the son of vintner Helvig Abbestée  (1697–1742) and Maria Barbara Fabritius (1704–75). His father and motherwho were uncle and niecebelonged to the city's German Reformist congregation. His dather went bankrupt for the second time in 1738. His mother was the younger sister of Michael Fabritius and Just Fabritius. His mother was after the father's death second time married to director in the Danish Asiatic Company Peter van Hurk (c. 1697–1775).

Career
 
Abbestée was in 1752 employed by the Danish Asiatic Company as a trade assistant in Tranquebar. He arrived in 1753 on board the company's ship Sydermanland. He was in 1755 sent on a mission to Travancore to negotiate a factory in Colachel under his own management. He was its first Opperhoofd but was already the following year appointed as Opperhoofd of the factory in Calicut.

In 1760, Abbestée returned to Tranquebar and was upon H. J. Forch's death, on 29 April 1761, elected as acting governor of the colony. In 1775, he was succeeded by David Brown and returned to Copenhagen. He was appointed as one of the seven directors of the Danish Asiatic Company. He represented the Danish Asiatic Company in the commission which was set up in connection with the transfer of the east Asiatic colonies to the state in 1777. Abbestée was the same year appointed as the first royal governor of Danish India and was granted the rank of Brigadier. In September he and his family boarded a ship bound for Tranquebar but the voyage ran into complications and it did not arrive until January 1779. In 1782, he successfully applied for permission to leave his office and return to Copenhagen. It was granted him but due to deaths among his colleagues he ended up acting as governor until finally being replaced by Peter Anker in 1788. Ge returned to Copenhagen in 1789.

Abbestée was alongside his office as governor also operating as a trader, partly backed by Anglo-Indian capital.

Personal life and legacy
Abbestée  was on 26 December 1768 married to Françoise Lange (15 January 1749  28  March 1779) in Tranquebar. Their daughter Marie Barbara (1770–1832) was married to  Conrad Lensgreve Blücher af Altona (1764–1845). Abbestée  also had another daughter, Pauline (1772–1801), by another unidentified slave. pauline was first time married to J. N. Müller (−1793) and second time married to Christian Tullin Boalth (1767–1822). She was the mother of admiral Catharina Pauli (1797–1856). Her daughter Fanny (1795–1833) married William Halling.

Abbestée purchased Amaliegade 14 in Copenhagen shortly prior to his death in 1794. He had inherited the country house Rustenborg in Kongens Lyngby after his foster father in 1775.

References

Further reading
 Feldbæk. Ole: India trade under the Danish Flag 1772–1808, 1969. – 
 Larsen, Kay: Dansk-ostindiske personalia og data, manus. på Kgl. bibl. og Rigsark. 1912

External links
 Hermann Abbestée at geni.com
 Timeline
 Timeline /dather
 Source

Danish civil servants
18th-century Danish businesspeople
Danish Asiatic Company people
Governors of Danish India
Danish expatriates in India
1728 births
1794 deaths